The Gottlieb Duttweiler Institute (GDI) is an independent think-tank and the oldest organisation of its kind in Switzerland. It is located in  Rüschlikon, near Zurich. The GDI is located on the edge of the Park im Grüene.

Established on 1 September 1963, the research institute  was conceived by and named after the founder of Migros, Gottlieb Duttweiler. Taking his principle of "Focus on people and not on capital" as its starting point, the GDI researches and debates issues relating to the fields of consumption, trade and society, and current topics of relevance to business and society.
It is owned by the "Im Grüene" Foundation, which is co-financed by Migros, Switzerland's largest retailer. Its research is published quarterly in the "GDI Impuls" magazine and published studies as well as the Gottfried Duttweiler Prize.

Directors of the GDI
Jørgen Thygesen, Virum/Denmark (1963–1964)
Hans A. Pestalozzi, on an interim basis (1964–1966)
Hans A. Pestalozzi (1966–1979)
Dr. Jürg Marx, on an interim basis (1979–1980)
Dr. Christian Lutz (1980–1998)
David Bosshart (starting 1999)

History

Adele and Gottlieb Duttweiler established the "Im Grüene" Foundation as far back as 1946 with the aim of setting up an institute that could conduct scientific research in the cooperative-society and merchandise-sourcing fields. They wanted to promote events, training courses and meetings that would serve as bridges between people and between nations.

But Gottlieb Duttweiler did not lay the foundation stone for the GDI until 1962, shortly before his death. It was built in the "Im Grüene" Park, the location of the founder's former residence, as an independent research institute for business and social studies.
His vision of integrating the economy with society, his enormous inquisitiveness about the future and his thinking on issues of social responsibility have been the basis of the GDI's activities right down to the present day.

Aims

The GDI Gottlieb Duttweiler Institute has been conducting independent research for more than forty years. Its aim is to promote unorthodox and unconventional thinking and thereby generate groundbreaking ideas and approaches to problems. The GDI endeavours to be a meeting place, a space for bold ideas and for communication that transcends boundaries.

Thanks to its networking, the GDI functions as a worldwide knowledge platform for researching and discussing economic and social issues and making the results available to a broader public.

The inscription at the entrance of the institute states the following:

Fields of activity
As a meeting place and knowledge hub, the GDI has four main focuses of activity: it is a research centre and innovative think-tank, publishes the findings of its research in studies and the quarterly "GDI Impuls", organises conferences and is accessible to a broader public as a conference and meeting venue.

Experts from business and society meet regularly at the GDI to discuss current trends and future developments. Specialist meetings organised in cooperation with international partners and universities, and evening events dealing with society-related issues, provide further opportunities for exchanging views and experience.

Topics
The main topics covered in the last few years largely concern the following four fields:
 Innovation in the retail and service sectors
 Food industry trends and analyses
 Marketing innovations and trends
 Social change and consumer trends

The GDI has been quick to identify many developments in business and society at an early stage as topics for discussion. As far back as 1964, for instance, it focused on "the introduction of evening opening hours". In 1974, it addressed the subject of organic farming, while "genetic engineering" was a major topic in 1986 and the "Europeanisation of gastronomy" in 2000. In 2005, it produced the "Gold Generation" study, an analysis of the ageing society. The study shows how the values and attitudes of an increasingly aged society change, what kind of lifestyle it cultivates and what makes the "gold generation" happy.

Conferences
The GDI organises regular conferences. They include the "International Retail Summit", "European Consumer Trend Conference", "European Foodservice Summit" and two series of events entitled "Food for Thought" and "Thought Leaders at GDI".

Prize

The Gottlieb Duttweiler Prize is awarded to extraordinary  individuals who have made outstanding contributions to the well-being of the wider community and who are distinguished by courage, persistence, commitment and the successful initiation and implementation of sustainable changes. The Prize is endowed in the amount of 100,000 Swiss Francs. The award-winners include media entrepreneur Roger Schawinski in 1998, German foreign minister Joschka Fischer in 2004 and the former United Nations Secretary-General and winner of the Nobel Peace Prize, Kofi Annan in 2008. The "Switzerland: a Prison" speech that writer Friedrich Dürrenmatt delivered on the occasion of the award of the prize to the then President of Czechoslovakia, Václav Havel, in 1990 aroused great interest. In 2011, the Gottlieb Duttweiler Prize was presented to Wikipedia co-founder Jimmy Wales, and the 2015 award went to World Wide Web inventor Tim Berners-Lee.

Awardees
 1970: Fritz Bramstedt, nutritionist, for his "fight" against tooth decay
 1972: Egon Kodicek, Cambridge, nutritionist
 1975: Paul Fabri, nutritionist, for his "fight" against obesity
 1988: Lisbeth and Robert Schläpfer (entrepreneurs), St. Gallen, entrepreneurship in the textile industry
 1990: Václav Havel, president of the Czech Republic
 1993: Esther Afua Ocloo, Ghana, entrepreneur and nutritionist
 1998: Roger Schawinski, Zurich, Journalist and pioneer in media
 2004: Joschka Fischer, former foreign minister of Germany
 2008: Kofi Annan, UN general secretary, nobel peace prize recipient
 2011: Jimmy Wales; co-founder of Wikipedia 
 2013: Ernst Fehr, Zurich; scientist
 2015: Tim Berners-Lee, developer of the world wide web
 2019: Watson, the computing platform in the field of artificial intelligence developed by IBM

References

External links

Think tanks based in Switzerland
Rüschlikon